The City of Colac was a local government area about  west-southwest of Melbourne, the state capital of Victoria, Australia. Its area was surrounded by the separate and largely rural Shire of Colac.

History

Colac was originally part of the Shire of Colac, which was first incorporated as a road district on 11 May 1859, and became a shire on 10 May 1864. On 19 January 1938, the Colac Riding severed and became a self-governing borough, which then became a town on 26 May 1948. It was proclaimed as a city on 26 January 1960.

On 23 September 1994, the City of Colac was abolished, and along with the Shires of Colac and Otway, and parts of the Shires of Heytesbury and Winchelsea, was merged into the newly created Colac-Otway Shire.

Wards
The City of Colac was not subdivided into wards, and its seven councillors represented the entire area.

Population

* Estimate in the 1958 Victorian Year Book.

References

External links
 Victorian Places - Colac

Colac City